The 2017 Alabama Crimson Tide softball team is an American softball team, representing the University of Alabama for the 2017 NCAA softball season. The Crimson Tide play their home games at Rhoads Stadium. After losing in the 2016 Women's College World Series, the 2017 team looks to make the postseason for the 19th straight year, and the Women's College World Series for twelfth time. This season represents the 21st season of softball in the school's history.

Personnel

Roster

2017 Alabama Crimson Tide Softball Roster

Coaching staff

Schedule 

|-
!colspan=9| Kickin' Chicken Classic

|-
!colspan=9|

|-
!colspan=9|Easton Bama Bash

|-
!colspan=9|

|-
!colspan=9|Easton Crimson Classic

|-
!colspan=9|

|-
!colspan=9|SEC softball tournament

|-
!colspan=9|NCAA Tuscaloosa Regional

|-
!colspan=9|NCAA Gainesville Super Regional

Honors and awards
 Alexis Osorio was selected to the Preseason All-SEC Team.
 Alexis Osorio was selected as the SEC Pitcher of the Week, February 13.
 Bailey Hemphill was selected as the SEC Freshman of the Week, February 13.
 Alexis Osorio was selected as the SEC Co-Pitcher of the Week, March 6.

Ranking movement

See also
 2017 Alabama Crimson Tide baseball team

References

Alabama
Alabama Crimson Tide softball seasons
Alabama Crimson Tide softball season
Alabama